Asukai Masaaki (飛鳥井雅章, 1611–1679) was a Japanese courtier and waka poet of the early Edo period. His Dharma name was Kukyō-in Gendō Bunga (究竟院原道文雅).

Biography

Ancestry, birth and early life 
He was the third son of Asukai Masatsune (ja). His two older brothers had both been banished by imperial command (ja) on the fourth day of the seventh month of 1609, but the younger of the two, Masanori (雅宣), was later pardoned, and raised the young Masaaki.

Political career and poetic achievements 
He was a prominent poet at the court of retired emperor Go-Mizunoo, and from the end of the Kan'ei era in 1644 until a year before his death more than three decades later he virtually monopolized the setting of the topics of poetic gatherings at the imperial palace. Seven years later, he was permitted to hear the same once again.

He was made  (court intermediary with the samurai class) in Kanbun 10 (1670). This position required him to travel back and forth between Kyoto and Kantō, and as a result he had many disciples in the eastern regions, especially among the warrior class. He became one of the most prominent waka poets of his era.

At the height of his political career, he had attained the Junior First Rank, and held the position of Provisional Major Counselor (gon-dainagon).

Later life and death 
According to the Kugyō Bunin, he died on the twelfth day of the tenth month of Enpō 7 (1679), when he was in his 69th year.

References

Works cited 

 

1611 births
1679 deaths
Japanese male poets
Fujiwara clan
Asukai family
17th-century Japanese poets
17th-century male writers